A Mayan language is one of a group of languages spoken by the Mayan people of Mesoamerica.

Mayan language may also refer to:

America
 Yucatec Maya language or Maya, a Mayan language spoken in the Yucatán Peninsula
 Pisabo language or Maya, found in the Amazon basin of Peru and Brazil
 Maya language (Brazil), perhaps one of the Panoan languages
 Maya script, ancient written Mayan
Mayan Numerals (Unicode block)

Africa
 Maya language (Nigeria), a Niger-Congo language of Nigeria
 Yendang languages of eastern Nigeria, also called Maya languages

Asia
 Maiya language, a Kohistani variety of Pakistan

Papua
 Maia language, a Madang language of New Guinea
 Ma'ya language, an Austronesian language of West Papua

Australia
 Maya language (Australia), scarcely attested
 Badimaya language or Parti-Maya, an aboriginal language of Australia
 Mayi-Kutuna language, an aboriginal language of Australia

Computers
 Maya Embedded Language, the language used in the Autodesk Maya software, also known as MEL

See also
Maya (disambiguation)